Brano Đukanović (born 21 March 1995) is a Serbian professional basketball player for Zlatibor.

Professional career
Đukanović grew up with Crvena zvezda youth teams and signed his first professional contract with the club in April 2013. He never played for Zvezda's first team. He was loaned to FMP where he played from 2013 to 2015. From 2015 to 2017 he played with Metalac Valjevo. In August 2017, he signed with Spanish club Força Lleida of the LEB Oro.
He finished that season as top 10 scorer. 
2018-2020 he played two great seasons in Tau Castellon. 
2020-2021 he played in Kalev Cramo VTB league.

In 2021, Đukanović signed with Atomerőmű SE of the Hungarian league and averaged 10.5 points and 1.8 rebounds per game. On January 31, 2022, he signed with Club Ourense Baloncesto of the Spanish LEB Plata.

National team career
He played for national Serbian team U16 . With Serbia's junior national team, Đukanović won the bronze medal at the 2012 FIBA Europe Under-18 Championship. He also played at the 2011 FIBA Europe Under-16 Championship and the 2013 FIBA Europe Under-18 Championship.

References

External links
 Profile at eurobasket.com
 Profile at fiba.com

1995 births
Living people
ABA League players
AB Castelló players
Basketball League of Serbia players
Basketball players from Belgrade
Força Lleida CE players
KK Crvena zvezda youth players
KK FMP players
KK Metalac Valjevo players
KK Zlatibor players
BC Kalev/Cramo players
Serbian expatriate basketball people in Hungary
Serbian expatriate basketball people in Spain
Serbian men's basketball players
Shooting guards